R. K. Chaudhary is an Indian politician belonging to the Samajwadi Party, and former Minister of Transport, Health, Science & Technology, Forest, Environment, Small Industry, Cooperative, Ambedkar Rural Development, Sports and Youth Welfare in the Government of Uttar Pradesh.   

•Two time Leader of the House Legislative Council UP. 

••Four time MLA & Four time Cabinet Minister.  

His political career started with Bahujan Samaj Party under the leadership supremo Kanshiram in Uttar Pradesh. He is also the founding member of BSP. He won the assembly seat from Manjhanpur(1993) & Mohanlalganj in 1996, as independent candidate 2002,2007. In the next elections he came up independently. He lost by a small margin. He joined the congress party in 2019 and fighting for his first loksabha election. He is quite popular for his ambedkarist & socialist ideas in marginalised section of society.

People recognize him as a BahujanNayak.

Founder President Social Organization BS-4 (Bahujan Samaj Swabhiman Sangharsh Samiti)

Through the BS-4 organization, Honourable R•K•Chaudhary started a movement named "Diversity Mission", its goal has been to get the participation of caste groups on the basis of population. There has been a demand for reservation to be implemented in India like Diversity of USA.  The slogan of the mission is the "ज़िसकी जितनी संख्या भारी, उसकी उतनी हिस्सेदारी"

RK Chaudhary Sahib is a Ambedkarite personality, he thinks that the progress of the country and the participation of the majority of the country can be achieved only when the people of Ambedkarite and socialist ideology will organize and fight for the weaker sections from the capitalist feudalist and Manuwadi ideology and will get their rights.  .

References

Living people
1954 births
Samajwadi Party politicians
Bahujan Samaj Party politicians from Uttar Pradesh
Indian National Congress politicians from Uttar Pradesh
Samajwadi Party politicians from Uttar Pradesh